{{DISPLAYTITLE:Omega1 Tauri}}

Omega1 Tauri is a solitary, orange hued star in the zodiac constellation of Taurus. It is faintly visible to the naked eye with an apparent visual magnitude of +5.51. Based upon an annual parallax shift of 11.22 mas as seen from Earth, it is located about 290 light years from the Sun.

This is an evolved K-type giant star with a stellar classification of K2 III. At the estimated age of 4.2 billion years, it is a red clump star that is generating energy by helium fusion at its core. Omega1 Tauri has about 1.5 times the mass of the Sun and has expanded to around 12 times the Sun's radius. It is radiating 57.5 times the Sun's luminosity from its photosphere at an effective temperature of 4,737 K. The radial velocity of this star shows no appreciable variation, and for this reason it is used as a radial velocity standard.

References

K-type giants
Horizontal-branch stars
Tauri, Omega
Taurus (constellation)
BD+19 0672
Tauri, 43
026162
019388
1283